PEIR may refer to:

 Prince Edward Island Regiment, an armoured reconnaissance regiment in the Canadian Forces primary reserve
 Prince Edward Island Railway, an historic railway in Canada